Berenice Venus or "The Benghazi Venus" is an ancient Cyrenaican Greek marble statue of the goddess of sexuality and erotic love Venus (150–100 BCE). It was found in Benghazi, Libya. which may have once marked the location of the legendary Lake Tritonis. It is currently located in the University of Pennsylvania Museum of Archaeology and Anthropology in Philadelphia, Pennsylvania.

References

External links
The Benghazi Venus - Penn Museum

History of Benghazi
Ancient Greek sculptures
Ptolemaic Kingdom
Venus Anadyomenes
Hellenistic sculpture
Marble sculptures in Pennsylvania
2nd-century BC sculptures
University of Pennsylvania Museum of Archaeology and Anthropology
Sculptures of Venus